Max Hubacher (born October 1st, 1993) is a Swiss actor. He became popular due to his acting in The Captain. He has appeared in more than ten films since 2010.

Selected filmography

Awards
 Shooting Stars Award (2012)

References

External links 

1993 births
Living people
Swiss male film actors